In Greek mythology, Elephantis (Ancient Greek: Ἐλεφαντίδος) was one of the multiple women of Danaus, king of Libya. She became the mother of two Danaides: Hypermnestra and Gorgophone. The latter married and murdered her husband Proteus during their wedding night while Hypermnestra spared the life of her spouse Lynceus. These couple the started a new line of the Argive dynasty and became the ancestors of Acrisius, Danae, Perseus, Heracles, etc.

According to Hippostratus, Danaus had all his progeny begotten by Europa, the daughter of the river-god Nilus. In some accounts, he married Melia, daughter of his uncle Agenor, king of Tyre.

Argive genealogy

Notes

References 

 Apollodorus, The Library with an English Translation by Sir James George Frazer, F.B.A., F.R.S. in 2 Volumes, Cambridge, MA, Harvard University Press; London, William Heinemann Ltd. 1921. ISBN 0-674-99135-4. Online version at the Perseus Digital Library. Greek text available from the same website.
Tzetzes, John, Book of Histories, Book VII-VIII translated by Vasiliki Dogani from the original Greek of T. Kiessling's edition of 1826. Online version at theio.com

Women in Greek mythology
Characters in Greek mythology